Mitesh Patel (born 1976) is a field hockey player from New Zealand.

Mitesh Patel may also refer to:

 Mitesh Patel (cricketer) (born 1997), Indian cricketer.
 Mitesh Rameshbhai Patel (fl. 2019), known as Bakabhai, Indian politician. 
 Mitesh Patel, founder of Lenstore in 2008
 Mitesh Patel, a fictional character in 2017 film Carry On Kesar